Braine-l'Alleud is a municipality of Wallonia located in the province of Walloon Brabant, Belgium, about  south of Brussels.  

The municipality consists of the following districts: Braine-l'Alleud (including the hamlet of Sart-Moulin), Lillois-Witterzée, and Ophain-Bois-Seigneur-Isaac. Bordering Flanders, the town is home to a minority of Dutch speakers.

The famous Lion of Waterloo, where the eponymous battle took place, is in the territory of Braine-l'Alleud.

History

Middle Ages
Several archaeological finds point to prehistoric settlements in this area.  The first historical mention of a parish on Braine-l'Alleud's current territory, then called Dudinsart, dates from 1131, date at which Godfrey I, Duke of Brabant ceded it to the Abbey of Gembloux.  The Duke, however, still owned exempt land (or franchise) on this territory, as specified in a legal document by Henry I dated 1197.  The name of the municipality changed to the current one, derived from “Braine”, former name of the stream that crosses its territory (now called the “Hain”), and “alleu(d)”, a medieval French word designating exempt land (English allod).  The latter name was added to the former to distinguish this community from two neighbouring ones also called Braine.

At the beginning, the franchise might not have been much more than a right to local administration.  By 1489, however, the local lord enjoyed complete juridical power on its territory, which was still formally part of the fiefdom obtained from the Duke of Brabant.

Battle of Waterloo
In 1815, part of the fighting that took place at the Battle of Waterloo actually occurred on the territory of Braine-l’Alleud.  The town's church of Saint-Étienne became a field hospital.

Sights
The Butte du Lion, erected on the site of the Battle of Waterloo, attracts thousands of visitors every year.  A nearby visitor centre, a wax museum and a painted Waterloo Panorama also help retrace the events that led to Napoleon's defeat in 1815.
Converted into a tourist information centre, the former house of Cardinal Mercier is a good starting point to explore the town.
Braine-l'Alleud is also home to a (slightly) smaller version of the well-known Manneken Pis, with the name "El Gamin qui Piche" (the peeing kid).
The hamlet of Sart-Moulin is the inverted name of which inspired Hergé’s Moulinsart castle.

Sport
Braine l'Alleud is home to RCS Braine football club, founded in 1913 and one of the oldest continuously existing clubs in the country.

The city also has a successful women's basketball club, BC Castors Braine.

The free-to-play, 18-hole Parc du Bourdon disc golf course is situated 1 kilometer from Braine L'Alleud train station.

Folklore 
Both Ophain and Braine-l'Alleud host yearly carnivals featuring giant puppets like in most other Belgian towns.

Famous inhabitants
Johannes Tinctoris, Franco-Flemish musicologist and composer (c. 1435–1511), was born in the municipality.
Désiré-Joseph Mercier, cardinal of the Roman Catholic Church and national hero (1851–1926)
Paul-Henri Spaak, politician and statesman (1899–1972)
Gaston Reiff, track-and-field athlete (1921–1992)
Amaury Bonduel, racing driver (born 1999)

Transportation 
 Rail: Braine l'Alleud has its own railway station part of the SNCB/NMBS network, served by the line number 124. See Braine-l'Alleud railway station.
 Bus: Société Régionale Wallonne du Transport (SRWT) (Walloon Regional Transport Company) operates under the name of "TEC Brabant Wallon".
It is served by the following 10 bus lines: 

 Taxi: Multiple taxi services exist and pick up and drop off around the town.
 Bicycle: Dedicated bicycle paths exist in the surroundings.

International relations

Twin towns – Sister cities
Braine-l'Alleud is twinned with:

References

External links

Official web site (in French)
Official web page (in English)

 
Municipalities of Walloon Brabant